The 2014 CFU Club Championship was the 16th edition of CFU Club Championship, the annual international club football competition in the Caribbean region, held amongst clubs whose football associations are affiliated with the Caribbean Football Union (CFU). The top three teams in the tournament qualified for the 2014–15 CONCACAF Champions League.

Teams
The tournament was open to all champion and runners-up from each member association’s league, once their competition ended on or before the end of 2013. Registration for all interested clubs closed on December 31, 2013. CONCACAF broadened the possibilities for participation and further indicated that the competition was not limited to professional clubs only. Therefore, clubs with amateur status were also eligible for participation.

A total of 13 teams from 9 CFU associations entered the competition. Valencia (Haiti) was given a bye to the final round as the best performer among the entrants both in the 2013 CFU Club Championship and the 2013–14 CONCACAF Champions League. The other 12 teams entered the first round.

The following associations did not enter a team:

 Anguilla
 Antigua and Barbuda
 Aruba
 Bahamas
 Barbados
 Bermuda
 Bonaire
 British Virgin Islands
 Cuba
 Dominica
 Dominican Republic
 French Guiana
 Grenada
 Martinique
 Montserrat
 Saint Kitts and Nevis
 Saint Lucia
 Saint-Martin
 Saint Vincent and the Grenadines
 Sint Maarten
 Turks and Caicos Islands
 United States Virgin Islands

First round
In the first round, the 12 teams were divided into three groups of four, with each group containing at least two league champions. Each group was played on a round-robin basis, hosted by one of the teams at a centralized venue. The winners of each group advanced to the final round to join Valencia.

Group 1
Hosted by Bayamón FC in Puerto Rico (all times UTC−4).

Group 2
Hosted by Mirebalais in Haiti (all times UTC−4).

Group 3
Hosted by Harbour View FC in Jamaica (all times UTC−5).

 Notch withdrew.

Final round
Under the original plan for the final round, the four teams would play matches on a knock-out basis, hosted by one of the teams at a centralized venue. The semifinal winners would play in the final while the losers would play in the third place match. Both finalists and the winner of the third place match would qualify for the 2014–15 CONCACAF Champions League.

On March 31, 2014, the CFU announced that Valencia, which were given a bye to the final round, could not participate in the competition after the Haitian Football Federation failed to confirm the club as an active member of the federation due to a fallout between the club and the federation. After consultation with CONCACAF and the three first round group winners which were to play with Valencia in the final round, the three group winners, Bayamón FC, Waterhouse, and Alpha United, were chosen to represent the CFU in the 2014–15 CONCACAF Champions League, subject to the clubs meeting the minimum standards for participation. Moreover, the final round was cancelled to save expenses for the three teams.

Semifinals

Third place match

Final

Bayamón FC, Waterhouse, and Alpha United qualified for the 2014–15 CONCACAF Champions League.

Top goalscorers

References

External links
CFU Club Championship, CFUfootball.org
CFU Club Championship 2014 results
CFU Club Championship 2014 standings

2014
1
2014–15 CONCACAF Champions League